The 2022 Basadi in Music Awards is the first  edition of Basadi in Music Awards. The ceremony took place at Gallagher Convention Centre, Midrand on October 15, 2022 hosted by Anele Zondo and Moozlie streamed live on YouTube and Instagram.

Background  
Nominations across 16 categories  were announced on July 6, 2022. 4 categories Kontemporêre Kunstenaar van die Jaar, Music Video Director of the Year, Gqom Artist of the Year and Kwaito Artist of the Year 
were cancelled due to low public voting.

Winners and nominees 
Below the list are the nominees were announced on July 6, 2022 live on YouTube and Kaya 959 by Dineo Ranaka.

Below list are nominees. Winners are listed first in bold.

Special awards

Joburg Tourism Company Humanitarian Award 
 Cynthia Dinalane

SAMPRA Highest Airplay 
 Shekhinah

Cappasso Most Streamed Song 
 Nomcebo Zikode – "Xola Moya Wam"

CEO Trailblazer Award  
 Zanele Mbokazi

Lifetime Achievement Award 
 Yvonne Chaka Chaka
 Abigail Kubeka

References 

2022 music awards